The World Group was the highest level of Davis Cup competition in 2008. The first-round losers went into the Davis Cup World Group Play-offs, and the winners progress to the quarterfinals. The quarterfinalists were guaranteed a World Group spot for 2009.

Participating Teams

Draw

First round

Russia vs. Serbia

Czech Republic vs. Belgium

Argentina vs. Great Britain

Israel vs. Sweden

Germany vs. South Korea

Peru vs. Spain

Romania vs. France

Austria vs. United States

Quarterfinals

Russia vs. Czech Republic

Argentina vs. Sweden

Germany vs. Spain

United States vs. France

Semifinals

Argentina vs. Russia

Spain vs. United States

Final

Argentina vs. Spain

References

World Group
Davis Cup World Group